The Sichuan Conservatory of Music (SCCM), founded in 1939, is an interdisciplinary music institution in Chengdu, Sichuan, China. SCCM is one of the select conservatories authorized by the State Council to confer graduate degrees to its music and fine arts majors.

Facilities
SCCM runs its own symphony orchestra, philharmonic orchestra, concert wind orchestra, Chinese traditional orchestra, college choirs, and pre-college ensembles. The conservatory holds hundreds of concerts throughout the year and regularly invites distinguished guest artists and teachers from around the world.

Every two years, the school hosts an intensive international piano festival, where students work with world-renowned artists such as Gary Graffman, John O'Conor, John Perry, and Boris Berman.

Provincial and municipal leaders have attached great importance to the development of SCCM. The government is in the process of constructing new concert halls on the existing conservatory grounds, as well as around the city of Chengdu.

Awards
Thousands of students from SCCM have won prizes at home and abroad, including over 430 international prizes.

In 2000, Yundi Li and Sa Chen won first and fourth place respectively in the “14th International Chopin Piano Competition." In 2005, Wei Wen won third place in the “9th Jean Sibelius International Violin Competition." In 2006, Feng Ning won third place in the “51st International Violin Competition 'Nicolo Paganini'".

The school's national key research projects such as “Research on the musical instruments of minority groups in southwest China” and “Research on the southwest Silk Road” have also yielded great achievements.

Chengdu Academy of Fine Arts

The Chengdu Academy of Fine Arts shares facilities with SCCM at its Xindu Campus.

See also
 Music of Sichuan
 Sichuan Fine Arts Institute, Chongqing

References

External links
 SCCM official website 

 
1939 establishments in China
Educational institutions established in 1939
Universities and colleges in Sichuan
Universities and colleges in Chengdu
Music schools in China
Arts in Chengdu